The National Security Adviser is a senior official in the cabinet of the President of Nigeria who manages national security on behalf of the President and serves as his chief advisor on all matters that are vital to the very survival of the state. The position is a statutory member of the Presidency, National Security Council and Federal Executive Council. 

The National Security Adviser is appointed by the President and does not require confirmation from the Nigerian Senate. The duties varies from administration to administration; and depends, not only on the qualities of the person appointed to the position, but also on the style and management philosophy of the incumbent President.

List

History 
Aliyu Gusau was appointed Coordinator of National Security by military president Ibrahim Babangida from 1986 to 1989. In this role, he led the dismantling of the National Security Organisation into the: State Security Service, National Intelligence Agency and the Defence Intelligence Agency. The politico-military situation of the early 1990s required the need for a central body for coordination, control and supervision of national security in Nigeria. In January 1993, Aliyu Gusau was appointed National Security Adviser. In August 1993, Ismaila Gwarzo replaced him and continued following the seizure of power by Sani Abacha. In June 1998, Abdullahi Mohammed, the former director of the National Security Organization was appointed to the position.

See also
National Security Organization
State Security Service (Nigeria)
Defence Intelligence Agency (Nigeria)
National Intelligence Agency (Nigeria)

References

Political office-holders in Nigeria